James Alexander Bryan, known as Brother Bryan, (March 20, 1863, near Kingstree, South Carolina – January 28, 1941, in Birmingham, Alabama) was a pastor of Third Presbyterian Church in Birmingham, Alabama.

Bryan came to Birmingham while he was still studying at Princeton University to serve as part-time pastor of Third Presbyterian Church. After graduating in 1889, he was ordained and installed as the full-time minister on August 4. As a minister, he conducted large evangelistic and prayer gatherings with various groups across the city and region. He was an outspoken supporter of civil rights and racial reconciliation in Birmingham. He is best remembered, however, for his tireless efforts to help the poor and homeless. It is said he would often arrive home at night without his overcoat because he had given it away to a stranger during the day. Though he was an ordained minister and honorary Doctor, he earned the title "brother" by addressing anyone he met as brother or sister.  His life and ministry were recounted by author Hunter Blakely in the 1934 book Religion in Shoes.

A 1934 statue of Brother Bryan kneeling in prayer by Georges Bridges is one of Birmingham's best-known landmarks, although it has been moved several times: From Five Points South to Vulcan Park and back to Five Points South. The "Brother Bryan Mission" was founded in 1940 to continue his work with the less fortunate. The City of Birmingham renamed Magnolia Park as "Brother Bryan Park". Bryan Memorial Presbyterian church in suburban Birmingham is also named in his honor.

He was elected in 2002 to the Alabama Men's Hall of Fame.

References
 Blakely, Hunter B. (1953) Religion in Shoes: Brother Bryan of Birmingham. Richmond, VA: John Knox.
 Bryan, Rev. James A. (n.d.) Sermons. Birmingham, AL: A. H. Cather.
 "Will Brother Bryan move again?" (March 3, 2004) Birmingham News.
 A Short History of Third Presbyterian Church 1884-2004; pamphlet arranged for Third's 120th Anniversary service

External links
 Brother Bryan statue at Birminghamart.org
 3rd Pres Website
 3rd Presbyterian on BhamWiki
 Brother Bryan Mission Website

1863 births
1941 deaths
American Presbyterian ministers
Religious leaders from Birmingham, Alabama
Princeton University alumni